Eleven Past One or at times 1:11 is a Canadian pop music band, most notable for their single The World Is Ours.

The band formed in 2007 in Bowmanville, Ontario. The members are two brothers, lead singer Daniel Richter and guitarist Stephen Richter, as well as their friends Kyle Bykiv on guitar, and Steve Patenaude on drums.

In early 2009, the band hooked a trailer to their SUV and drove around the south of the United States for six months, living in trailer parks with no electricity or running water. They played in Cocoa Beach, where singer Daniel Richter, his brother and guitarist Stephen Richter and drummer Steve Patenaude played to sunbathers.

The trio eventually met an investor and a producer, which led to a three-month recording session in Los Angeles and a debut LP, The Ultimate Catch. The album caught the attention of manager Eric Clinger who introduced the group to Hedley and Simple Plan producer Brian Howes, a collaboration that yielded The World Is Ours, the band’s breakthrough single.

Eleven Past One took the song directly to Virgin Radio in Toronto. "The World Is Ours" soon became a top 15 radio hit in Canada, its Cuba-shot video gained 750,000 hits on YouTube and the group signed a deal with Warner Music Canada. "The World Is Ours" was certified gold in Canada on July 25, 2013. It spent 11 weeks on Billboard's Canadian Hot 100, peaking at number 32 and 20 weeks on the Canadian singles chart, peaking at number 23.

The band released the EP The World Is Ours in November 2014. The eight-track record features collaborations with Ryan Williams (Pink, Kelly Clarkson), Ryan Stewart (Carly Rae Jepsen, Victoria Duffield) as well as Andy Stochansky and Goo Goo Dolls front man John Rzeznik, who produced the pensive piano ballad "There’s Nothing Wrong."

Eleven Past One has performed with Cody Simpson, Hedley, Down with Webster and many more.
Their biggest show to date was alongside R5 and Zendaya at the Molson Canadian Amphitheatre; the show was sold out and televised on the Family Channel.

TV performances include MuchMusic's New Music Live, The Marilyn Denis Show, YTV's The Next Star, Canada AM, The Morning Show, Breakfast Television, CP24, Family Channel and Juicebox.

The band committed to touring across North America and around the world in 2014 and 2015. The band released a new single "Forever Now" January 16th 2017 through a U.S record company Reliant Music. Their next single "Dynamite" is scheduled to be released March 20th 2017.

Daniel Richter, the lead vocalist of the band is featured on the 2014 hit "Light Up" by the Canadian artist iSH (Ishan Morris).

In 2017, Eleven Past One released their Non-Album single called "Closer", But it is a Lyric Video Version.

But Since Eleven Past One released their single Closer, No One has heard from Eleven Past One Band at all in this present day.

Members
Daniel Richter – vocals
Stephen Richter – guitar
Justin Hartshorn - bass
Steve Patenaude – drums

 Former members
Dan Beattie – bass
Kyle Bykiv - guitar

Discography

Studio albums

Singles

Music videos

Daniel Richter discography

As featured artist

References

External links
 Facebook
 Eleven Past One at last.fm

Musical groups established in 2007
Canadian pop music groups
Musical groups from the Regional Municipality of Durham
2007 establishments in Ontario
Musical quintets